Opsodoras is a genus of thorny catfishes native to the Amazon basin of South America.

Species 
There are currently 3 recognized species in this genus:
 Opsodoras boulengeri Steindachner, 1915
 Opsodoras morei Steindachner, 1881
 Opsodoras stuebelii (Steindachner, 1882)

Opsodoras species range from about 10.3–14.2 centimetres (4.1–5.6 in) SL.

References

Doradidae
Fish of South America
Catfish genera
Taxa named by Carl H. Eigenmann
Freshwater fish genera